John A. Fridd (October 23, 1850 – September 24, 1934) was a member of the Wisconsin State Assembly and Wisconsin State Senate.

Biography
Fridd was born on October 23, 1850 in Winnebago County, Wisconsin. He attended Ripon College.

He married Addie Fridd in 1872.

Career
Fridd was elected to the Assembly in 1902 and 1904. Other positions he held include town chairman, similar to mayor. He was a Republican. Fridd served in the Wisconsin State Senate from 1907 to 1911.

Fridd moved to California, where he died on September 24, 1934 in Fullerton.

References

External links
Political Graveyard

1850 births
1934 deaths
People from Winnebago County, Wisconsin
Republican Party Wisconsin state senators
Mayors of places in Wisconsin
Ripon College (Wisconsin) alumni
Republican Party members of the Wisconsin State Assembly